Martin Pavlov Georgiev (born 24 September 2005) is a Bulgarian footballer who currently plays as a defender for Barcelona Juvenil A.
He was included in The Guardian's "Next Generation" list for 2022.

Club career

Slavia Sofia
Born in Sofia, Georgiev started his career in the local Slavia Sofia. He made his professional debut for the team on 11 November 2021 in a league match against CSKA Sofia. Week later, he played his second league match against Ludogorets, but he was sent off with a straight red after a heavy foul. In May 2022, was reported that Barcelona are interested to sign Martin. On June 1, Slavia's owner, Ventseslav Stefanov, announced that the deal is almost completed and Martin would sign with Barcelona for 2 years.

Barcelona
On 15 July 2022, Georgiev joined Barcelona Juvenil A. In September of the same year, he was named by English newspaper The Guardian as one of the best players born in 2005 worldwide.

International career
Georgiev represented Bulgaria U17 on the 2022 UEFA European Under-17 Championship where the team finished last in the group stage.

Career statistics

Club

Notes

References

2005 births
Living people
Bulgarian footballers
Bulgaria youth international footballers
Association football defenders
First Professional Football League (Bulgaria) players
PFC Slavia Sofia players
FC Barcelona Atlètic players